Valeria Chiaraviglio Ermácora (born 9 April 1989) is an Argentine athlete specialising in the pole vault.

She is the younger sister of another pole vaulter, Germán Chiaraviglio. Her personal best in the event is 4.20 metres set in Santa Fe in 2011.

International competitions

References

1989 births
Living people
Argentine people of Italian descent
Argentine female pole vaulters
Sportspeople from Santa Fe, Argentina
Athletes (track and field) at the 2015 Pan American Games
Pan American Games competitors for Argentina